Class 13 may refer to:

 British Rail Class 13, diesel locomotives 
 SNCB Class 13 electric locomotives
 The DRG Class 13, a German steam locomotive class. Within this class the Deutsche Reichsbahn incorporated former state railway tender locomotives with a 4-4-0 wheel arrangement.
 Class 13.0: Prussian S 3
 Class 13.3: PKP Class Pd1 (Prussian S 5.2, Prussian S 3)
 Class 13.4: PKP Class Pd2 (Prussian S 4)
 Class 13.5: Prussian S 4
 Class 13.5II: PKP Class Pd5 (Prussian S 6)
 Class 13.10-12: Prussian S 6
 Class 13.16: Württemberg AD
 Class 13.17: Württemberg ADh
 Class 13.18: Oldenburg S 3 and Oldenburg S 5